Joe Borg (born 1986) is a Maltese-English screenwriter and director known for his feature scripts What Not To Forget and comedy The Stalker Cycle, which won the 2015 Best Narrative Feature of the American Movie Awards. His drama script What Not To Forget was named a semi-finalist in the 2016 BlueCat Screenplay Competition.

References

Living people
English screenwriters
English male screenwriters
Maltese screenwriters
1986 births